Martin Francis Foster (born 12 May 1952) is an English professional golfer who played on the European Tour from 1974 to 1982 and later on the European Senior Tour. He never won on the European Tour but was runner-up five times,  the Double Diamond Strokeplay in 1975, the Irish Open and Uniroyal International Championship in 1976, the Kerrygold International Classic in 1977 and the Coral Welsh Classic in 1980. He finished 7th in the 1976 European Tour Order of Merit.

In the 1977 Open Championship at Turnberry, Foster has a first-round 67 to lie in second place. Further rounds of 74, 75 and 73 left him tied for 26th place.

Amateur wins
1969 Boys Amateur Championship
1970 Carris Trophy

Results in major championships

Note: Foster only played in The Open Championship.

CUT = missed the half-way cut
"T" = tied

Team appearances
World Cup (representing England): 1976
Double Diamond International (representing England): 1976 (winners)
Hennessy Cognac Cup (representing Great Britain and Ireland): 1976 (winners)

References

External links

English male golfers
European Tour golfers
Sportspeople from Bradford
1952 births
Living people